Akraka is a surname. Notable people with the surname include:

 Maria Akraka (born 1966), Swedish entrepreneur, television host, and middle-distance runner
 Smart Akraka (1934–2016), Nigerian sprinter, father of Maria

Surnames of Nigerian origin